Iranian identity booklet, known as Shenasnameh, is one of the identity documents in Iran. This identity document is in booklet form and issued for Iran citizens at birth. The National Organization for Civil Registration of Iran is obliged to issue an identity booklet to every Iranian citizen.

Iranian citizens have two identity documents: one is an Iranian identity card that contains their National Identity Number and the other is the identity booklet that contains more details about the person.

To participate in the Elections in Iran, having an identity booklet is a requirement.

According to the Civil Registration Reform Law approved on 8 January 1985 in Iran, the cover and the first page of the identity booklet are decorated with the Emblem of the Islamic Republic of Iran.

History

According to the decision of the Iran's Cabinet of Ministers on 12 December 1918 during the Qajar era, the regulations for the establishment of the Civil Registry Office in the Ministry of Interior were prepared. The first Iranian identity booklet or Shenasnameh (then called Sajl) was issued on 25 December 1918 for a newborn girl named "Fatemeh Irani". Because of that in many years later, the third day of Dey (month) (23 or 24 December) has been named as National Organization for Civil Registration Day in Iran.

From March 1925, according to the law, obtaining identity booklet was required for all Iranian citizens in the areas where the Civil Registry Office was established.

The identity booklet information
Each Iranian identity booklet must contain the following information:

Information about the owner
 Name, Surname and Gender
 Scanned Photograph of the face of owner
 Identity booklet number
 National Identity Number
 Birth date: day, month and year in format of Solar Hijri calendar and Islamic calendar
 Place of birth: County, District, Administrative division, City, Village
 Father's name and mother's name
 National Identity Number or Identity booklet number of parents
 Place of birth of parents
 Special field for registration of Marriage and Divorce and details about Spouse
 Special field for children's names and specifications
 Special field for registration of the owner's death

Document information
 Consecutive and series number of the booklet
 Date of document preparation: day, month and year in format of Solar Hijri calendar
 Document preparation location: Area, County, District, Administrative division, City, Village
 Name and surname of the document regulator; Signature of the issuing officer and stamp of the office
 Special field for description (such as renaming)
 Special field for multiplying stamps (such as the stamp of participation in Election)

Multiplying stamps
According to the Civil Registry law of Iran, only the following institutions are allowed to stamp on the identity booklet:

 National Organization for Civil Registration of Iran
 Marriage and divorce notaries offices
 Embassies of Iran in other countries
 Identification administration of the Law Enforcement Force of the Islamic Republic of Iran
 Interpol
 General Election Administration of the Ministry of Interior

Elimination of spouse name
It is possible to eliminate spouse's name after divorce under certain conditions in Iran.

Invalidation
The identity booklet is revoked in two conditions: one is renunciation of Iranian nationality law and the other is death.

See also
 Iranian identity card
 Driving licence in Iran
 Iranian passport
 Tajik passport (Shinosnoma, Tajik for Shenasnameh)
 Identity documents in Iran

References

Bibliography
 Council of Europe. Committee of Ministers (2005). Identity and Travel Documents and the Fight Against Terrorism: Recommendation Rec(2005)7.
 Jane Caplan, John C. Torpey (2001). Documenting Individual Identity: The Development of State Practices in the Modern World. Princeton University

External links
 Iran Civil Registration Law text
 National Organization for Civil Registration (Iran) on GHDx
 Iranian National Organization for Civil Registration news on TehranTimes
 Iran among the best in Civil Registration and Vital Statistics

Genealogy
Personal identification
Iranian nationality law
Authentication methods in Iran
Identity documents of Iran